Arthur Sylvester Collins Jr. (August 6, 1915 – January 7, 1984) was a United States Army lieutenant general who served as commander of I Field Force, Vietnam during the Vietnam War.

Early life and education
Collins was born on 6 August 1915 in the Mission Hill section of Boston, Massachusetts and attended Boston Latin School. He graduated from the United States Military Academy, West Point, New York, with a Bachelor of Science degree in 1938 and was commissioned as a second lieutenant in the infantry. Collins later graduated from the Army War College in 1953. He also earned an M.A. degree in international affairs from George Washington University in 1964.

Military career
In May 1942 Collins was appointed as battalion commander of the 1st Battalion, 130th Infantry Regiment. In May 1944 the 130th Infantry deployed to Finschhafen in New Guinea. In August 1944 Collins assumed command of the 130th Infantry, commanding the regiment during the Battle of Morotai and Battle of Luzon, where the 130th Infantry participated in the capture of Baguio. The 130th Infantry then participated in the Occupation of Japan, landing there in September 1945.

In June 1965 Collins was appointed as commander of the 4th Infantry Division and led it during its deployment to South Vietnam in August 1966 and remained in command until January 1967.

In January 1970 Collins was appointed to command I Field Force, Vietnam, which he commanded from February 1970 to January 1971. Upon reviewing some of the more optimistic portions of his predecessor General William R. Peers' debriefing report, he questioned the existence of any discernible progress during the past two years. "Frankly," Collins observed, "I do not know what happened between 1968–1970," believing that "if the ARVN combat units had improved as much as indicated by General Peers, somewhere along the line they had again slipped back a long way." Upon his arrival in February 1970, Collins judged that the local Vietnamese forces were "woefully weak because of lack of leadership at the regimental and battalion level," and he exhibited little of Peers' optimism.

Collins served as acting Commanding General, United States Army Europe from 20 March to 26 May 1971. He retired from the army in July 1974.

Collins lived in Alexandria, Virginia after retirement. He contracted cancer and died on 7 January 1984 at the Walter Reed Army Medical Center in Washington, D.C. Collins was buried at the West Point Cemetery on 11 January 1984.

References

1915 births
1984 deaths
People from Boston
Boston Latin School alumni
United States Military Academy alumni
Military personnel from Massachusetts
United States Army personnel of World War II
Recipients of the Air Medal
Recipients of the Silver Star
United States Army War College alumni
Elliott School of International Affairs alumni
United States Army personnel of the Vietnam War
Recipients of the Legion of Merit
United States Army generals
Recipients of the Distinguished Service Medal (US Army)
People from Alexandria, Virginia
Deaths from cancer in Washington, D.C.
Burials at West Point Cemetery